Brandenburg v. Ohio, 395 U.S. 444 (1969), is a landmark decision of the United States Supreme Court interpreting the First Amendment to the U.S. Constitution. The Court held that the government cannot punish inflammatory speech unless that speech is "directed to inciting or producing imminent lawless action and is likely to incite or produce such action". Specifically, the Court struck down Ohio's criminal syndicalism statute, because that statute broadly prohibited the mere advocacy of violence. In the process, Whitney v. California (1927) was explicitly overruled, and Schenck v. United States (1919), Abrams v. United States (1919), Gitlow v. New York (1925), and Dennis v. United States (1951). were effectively overturned.

Background
Clarence Brandenburg, a Ku Klux Klan (KKK) leader in rural Ohio, contacted a reporter at a Cincinnati television station and invited him to cover a KKK rally that would take place in Hamilton County in the summer of 1964. Portions of the rally were filmed, showing several men in robes and hoods, some carrying firearms, first burning a cross and then making speeches. One of the speeches made reference to the possibility of "revengeance" against "Niggers", "Jews", and those who supported them and also claimed that "our President, our Congress, our Supreme Court, continues to suppress the white, Caucasian race", and announced plans for a march on Congress to take place on the Fourth of July. Another speech advocated for the forced expulsion of African Americans to Africa and Jewish Americans to Israel.

Brandenburg was charged with advocating violence under Ohio's criminal syndicalism statute for his participation in the rally and for the speech he made. In relevant part, the statute – enacted in 1919 during the First Red Scare – proscribed "advocat[ing] ... the duty, necessity, or propriety of crime, sabotage, violence, or unlawful methods of terrorism as a means of accomplishing industrial or political reform" and "voluntarily assembl[ing] with any society, group or assemblage of persons formed to teach or advocate the doctrines of criminal syndicalism".

Convicted in the Court of Common Pleas of Hamilton County, Brandenburg was fined $1,000 and sentenced to one to ten years in prison. On appeal, the Ohio First District Court of Appeal affirmed Brandenburg's conviction, rejecting his claim that the statute violated his First Amendment and Fourteenth Amendment right to freedom of speech. The Supreme Court of Ohio dismissed his appeal without opinion.

The rather cursory way in which the Ohio courts dismissed Brandenburg's constitutional arguments is unsurprising in light of the state of First Amendment law in the pre-Brandenburg era. Although Yates v. United States (1957) had overturned the convictions of mid-level Communist Party members in language that seemed suggestive of a broader view of freedom of expression rights than had been accorded them in Dennis v. United States (1951), all Yates purported to do was construe a federal statute, the 1940 Smith Act. Thus, Dennis reading of the First Amendment remained in force: advocacy of law violation, even as an abstract doctrine, could be punished under law consistent with the free speech clause.

Decision
The U.S. Supreme Court reversed Brandenburg's conviction, holding that government cannot constitutionally punish abstract advocacy of force or law violation. The majority opinion was per curiam, issued from the Court as an institution, rather than as authored and signed by an individual justice. The earlier draft had originally been prepared by Justice Abe Fortas before he was forced to resign in the midst of an ethics scandal, and it would have included a modified version of the clear and present danger test. In finalizing the draft, Justice Brennan eliminated all references to it by substituting the "imminent lawless action" language. Justices Black and Douglas concurred separately.

Per curiam opinion
The per curiam majority opinion struck down the Ohio Criminal Syndicalism statute, overruled Whitney v. California (1927), and articulated a new test – the "imminent lawless action" test – for judging what was then referred to as "seditious speech" under the First Amendment:

In Schenck v. United States (1919) the Court had adopted a "clear and present danger" test that Whitney v. California (1927) subsequently expanded to a "bad tendency" test: if speech has a "tendency" to cause sedition or lawlessness, it may constitutionally be prohibited. Dennis v. United States (1951), a case dealing with prosecution of alleged Communists under the Smith Act for advocating the overthrow of the government, used the clear and present danger test while still upholding the defendants' convictions for acts that could not possibly have led to a speedy overthrow of the government.

The per curiam opinion cited Dennis v. United States (1951) as though it were good law and amenable to the result reached in Brandenburg. However, Brandenburg completely did away with Dennis central holding and held that "mere advocacy" of any doctrine, including one that assumed the necessity of violence or law violation, was per se protected speech. It may be that principles of stare decisis figured in the Court's decision to avoid overruling the relatively recent Dennis, but the distance between the two cases' approach is obvious and irreconcilable.

The Brandenburg test (also called the "imminent lawless action" test)
The three distinct elements of this test (intent to speak, imminence of lawlessness, and likelihood of lawlessness) have distinct precedential lineages.

Judge Learned Hand was possibly the first judge to advocate the intent standard, in Masses Publishing Co. v. Patten (1917), reasoning that "[i]f one stops short of urging upon others that it is their duty or their interest to resist the law, it seems to me one should not be held to have attempted to cause its violation". However, the Brandenburg intent standard is more speech-protective than Hand's formulation, which contained no temporal element of imminence.

The imminence element was a departure from earlier rulings. Brandenburg did not explicitly overrule the bad tendency test, but it appears that after Brandenburg, the test is de facto overruled. The Brandenburg test effectively made the time element of the clear and present danger test more defined and more rigorous. Applying the Brandenburg test in Hess v. Indiana (1973) the Supreme Court held that the prerequisite for speech which is not protected by the First Amendment is that the speech in question must lead to “imminent disorder”.

Concurrences
Justice Hugo Black, renowned civil libertarian and First Amendment absolutist, filed a short concurrence indicating his agreement with Justice William O. Douglas's longer opinion and pointing out that the per curiams reliance on Dennis was more symbolic than actual.

Justice Douglas's concurrence reflected the absolutist position that only he and Black, among Supreme Court justices, ever fully subscribed to, namely that the phrase "no law" in the First Amendment ought to be interpreted very literally, and that all speech is immune from prosecution, regardless of the governmental interests advanced in suppressing some particular instance of speech. He briefly traced the history of the "clear and present danger" test, illustrating how it had been used over the years since its debut in Schenck to dismiss dozens of what Douglas viewed as legitimate First Amendment claims.

A short section of Douglas's opinion indicated that he might be open to allowing the government greater latitude in controlling speech during time of "declared war" (making clear that he was not referring to the then-current Vietnam War), although he only phrased that possibility in terms of doubt (as opposed to his certainty that the clear and present danger test was irreconcilable with the First Amendment during time of peace).

Douglas also argued for the legitimate role of symbolic speech in First Amendment doctrine, using examples of a person ripping up a Bible to celebrate the abandonment of his faith or tearing a copy of the Constitution in order to protest a Supreme Court decision, and assailed the previous term's United States v. O'Brien, which had allowed for the prosecution of a man for burning his draft card. In all these situations, Douglas argued, an action was a vital way of conveying a certain message, and thus the action itself deserved First Amendment protection.

Finally, Douglas dealt with the classic example of a man "falsely shouting fire in a theater and causing a panic". In order to explain why someone could be legitimately prosecuted for this, Douglas called it "a classic case where speech is brigaded with action". In the view of Douglas and Black, this was probably the only sort of case in which a person could be prosecuted for speech.

Subsequent developments
The Brandenburg test was the Supreme Court's last major statement on what government may do about inflammatory speech that seeks to incite others to lawless action. It resolved the debate between those who urged greater government control of speech for reasons of security and those who favored allowing as much speech as possible and relying on the marketplace of ideas to reach a favorable result, leaving the law in a state along the lines of that which Justices Louis Brandeis, and, post-Schenck, Oliver Wendell Holmes advocated in several dissents and concurrences during the late 1910s and early 1920s. 

The Brandenburg test remains the standard used for evaluating attempts by the government to punish inflammatory speech, and it has not been seriously challenged since it was laid down in 1969. Very few cases have actually reached the Court during the past decades that would test the outer limits of Brandenburg. The most significant application of Brandenburg came four years after in Hess v. Indiana. 

Brandenburg has come under criticism in the twenty-first century. Lyrissa Lidsky, a scholar of the law, stated that "Brandenburg's sanguine attitude toward the prospect of violence rests on an assumption about the audiences of radical speech. Brandenburg assumes that most citizens ... simply are not susceptible to impassioned calls to violent action by radical speakers." It has also become more common for lower federal courts to apply the test loosely, especially in circumstances related to online terrorist recruitment.

The Washington Post reported the Brandenburg precedent to be "at the center" of the second impeachment trial of Donald Trump.

See also

List of United States Supreme Court cases, volume 395
Shouting fire in a crowded theater
Threatening the president of the United States
Chaplinsky v. New Hampshire, 
Cohen v. California, 
Feiner v. New York, 
Korematsu v. United States, 
Kunz v. New York, 
National Socialist Party of America v. Village of Skokie, 
 R.A.V. v. City of St. Paul, 
Sacher v. United States,  
Terminiello v. Chicago, 
 Virginia v. Black, 
 Second impeachment trial of Donald Trump § House's brief, Trump's answer, House's replication

References

External links

Brandenburg v. Ohio from C-SPAN's Landmark Cases: Historic Supreme Court Decisions

United States Supreme Court decisions that overrule a prior Supreme Court decision
United States Free Speech Clause case law
1969 in United States case law
American Civil Liberties Union litigation
History of racism in Ohio
Hate speech case law
United States Supreme Court cases of the Warren Court
Ku Klux Klan
United States Supreme Court cases